Benedictine High School may refer to:

Benedictine High School (Ohio), Cleveland, Ohio, US
Benedictine College Preparatory, Richmond, Virginia, US; known as Benedictine High School until 2011
Benedictine Academy, Elizabeth, New Jersey, US
Benedictine Military School, Savannah, Georgia, US
Benedictine School, Ridgely, Maryland, US
Mount Michael Benedictine High School, Elkhorn, Nebraska, US